is a Japanese manga series written by Hiroshi Noda and illustrated by Takahiro Wakamatsu. It was serialized in Kodansha's shōnen manga magazine Monthly Shōnen Magazine from October 2019 to November 2022, and has been collected in six tankōbon volumes. An anime television series adaptation produced by Project No.9 aired from April to June 2022.

Plot
In order to combat the villainous , who have burnt half of the world and are planning to burn the rest, the hero group  is formed, consisting of Fudo Aikawa (Red Gelato), Hayato Ōjino (Blue Gelato), Misaki Jingūji (Yellow Gelato), Daigo Todoroki (Green Gelato), Haru Arisugawa (Pink Gelato), and their leader Professor Big Gelato. However, things change when Gekko recruits a new member, the Reaper Princess Desumi Magahara. Not only is Desumi a formidable fighter, but she and Fudo also happen to fall in love with each other despite being mortal enemies. Even though neither of them have any experience in romance, they begin dating in secret, trying to hide their relationship from their respective organizations.

Characters

Main characters
 / 

Desumi is a Secret Society Gekko soldier who is known as the Reaper Princess due to her superhuman strength and perceived sadism. While resistant to dating Fudō at first, her desire to be loved and to be in love, combined with Fudo's earnest nature, convinced her to date him. 
 / 

Fudo, also known as Red Gelato, is the leader of the Freezing Sentai Gelato 5 and a workout enthusiast. He fell in love with Desumi at first sight, and successfully began dating her.

Freezing Sentai Gelato 5
 / 

Hayato, also known as Blue Gelato, is a playboy whose popular among girls. He has a crush on Kiki Majima, not knowing of her involvement with Gekko as the Beast Princess.
 / 

Misaki, also known as Yellow Gelato, is a member who acts as the big sister of the group.
 / 

Haru, also known as  Pink Gelato, is the newest member of the group. She idolized Desumi after she saved her from bullies during middle school, even though she did not know her name or who she was at the time, using it as one of the reasons she joined the Freezing Sentai Gelato 5. She has a long-standing crush on Fudo.
 / 

Daigo, also known as  Green Gelato, is a man who acted as Desumi's martial arts mentor in the past once their dojo closed down. However, due to how strong she was, he has PTSD.

The mentor and handler of the Freezing Sentai Gelato 5 who supplies the group with their weapons and technology.

Secret Society Gekko

The supreme leader of Gekko, he leads his organization with a goal of bringing destruction towards society.
 / 

The brash and loud, animal-themed princess, she has a rivalry with Desumi and a contentious relationship with Blue Gelato.
 / 

A quiet and shy, armor-themed princess and subordinate to Catapult Snake; she is a close friend of Desumi's and later begins a relationship with Culverin Bear.
 / 

A flame-themed princess and subordinate to Matchlock Eagle who keeps her identity a secret from everyone within Gekko. She is secretly in love with Desumi. 

A large bear monster who works for Gekko and serves as Desumi's superior, he usually has some sort of new weaponry that malfunctions and ruins his missions. He later begins a relationship with Steel Princess.

A large snake monster who works for Gekko and is the superior to Steel Princess.

A large eagle monster who works for Gekko and is the superior to Heat Princess.

A large rabbit monster who works for Gekko and is the superior to Judgment Princess.
 / 

The only princess who is not a high school student as she works as a school nurse at Desumi's school. She is in love with Bosslar and has a tendency of treating and brainwashing her patients into acting as babies.    
 / 

The only foreign princess who dresses in Korean martial arts attire and subordinate to Drone Rabbit. She starts off distant and hard to read, never having socialized with anyone outside of missions, but slowly opens up when Desumi convinces her to spend more time with her fellow princesses.

The result of Gekko's long-desired goal to create the ultimate monster.

Other characters

Desumi's beloved cat who is only seen at her dorm room at the Gekko premises. Though often coming off as bored and uninterested, she deeply cares for Desumi and swears payback on those who might end up hurting her.

Desumi's younger sister who idolizes her greatly.

Anna is an actress hired to appear in a wedding commercial with Fudo, who is her favorite member of Gelato 5.

Production
The character design of Desumi is referenced to Gwen in Spider-Man: Into the Spider-Verse and Nai in Mahō Sentai Magiranger.

Media

Manga
Love After World Domination, written by Hiroshi Noda and illustrated by Takahiro Wakamatsu, was serialized in Monthly Shōnen Magazine from October 4, 2019, to November 5, 2022. Kodansha collected its chapters into six tankōbon volumes, which were released from April 10, 2020, to December 15, 2022.  The manga is licensed in English by Kodansha USA in digital form.

Volume list

Anime
An anime television series adaptation was announced in the May 2021 issue of Monthly Shōnen Magazine on April 6, 2021. The series was produced by Project No.9 and directed by Kazuya Iwata, with Satoru Sugizawa overseeing the scripts, Akemi Kobayashi designing the characters, Satoshi Motoyama serving as the sound director, and Satoshi Hōno and Ryūnosuke Kasai composing the music. It aired from April 8 to June 24, 2022, on AT-X, Tokyo MX, BS Asahi, and TV Aichi. Masayoshi Ōishi and Yukari Tamura performed the opening theme song   from Episodes 1–5 and 7–11, while Ōishi and Hiroki Yasumoto performed the theme for Episode 6, with the latter doing so as his character Culverin Bear.

Funimation originally licensed the series outside of Japan, but it was transferred over to Crunchyroll following Sony's acquisition of the latter. On April 11, 2022, Crunchyroll announced that the series would receive an English dub, which premiered on April 22.

Episode list

Reception
The series was nominated for the Eisner Award for Best Digital Comic in 2022.

The anime adaptation's first episode garnered positive reviews from Anime News Network's staff during the Spring 2022 season previews. James Beckett called it "an extremely cute and surprisingly well-produced romantic comedy", but also critiqued that it could "easily suffer from diminishing returns" with lesser animation and an overreliance on the same jokes. Richard Eisenbeis found the Fudō-Desumi relationship "ultra-cute" and having "a sprinkle of social commentary", but felt the tokusatsu content lacked "subversion" and causes the series to feel "painfully predictable and almost boring" when away from the main couple, concluding that he will check out the manga to see if he might watch more of the show. Rebecca Silverman called it "equal parts super sentai sendup and gooey romcom, and it looks like those two things are going to mesh just as well here as they do in the source manga." Nicholas Dupree praised the production for keeping the Super Sentai humor fresh while displaying some "A+ romcom blushing", "cool fight choreography" and proper cheesecake in its fan service, concluding that: "I'm not going to tell you this show is deep or thought-provoking or even particularly romantic, but what I will say is I had a big dumb grin on my face the entire episode." Allen Moody, writing for THEM Anime Reviews, felt the series' outlandish premise was too tame and restrained in execution, the Fudō-Desumi pairing "disappointingly conventional" and a lack of focus on the supporting cast, concluding that: "[And] while some of the jokes work just fine, there were some missed opportunities as well."

See also
Ningyohime no Gomen ne Gohan, another manga series by the same authors
No Longer Allowed In Another World, another manga series by the same authors

Notes

References

External links
 at Monthly Shōnen Magazine 
 

2019 manga
2022 anime television series debuts
Anime series based on manga
AT-X (TV network) original programming
Crunchyroll anime
Kodansha manga
Parody anime and manga
Project No.9
Romantic comedy anime and manga
School life in anime and manga
Shōnen manga
Superheroes in anime and manga
Tokusatsu television series